The Mondrians is The Mondrians' debut album. It was released on November 5, 2009. The album was recorded in the summer of 2008, in Spain with Gordon Raphael.

Production and release
The album was recorded in the summer of 2008 in Spain with producer Gordon Raphael, best known for his work with The Strokes. The extensive time lapse between the end of the recording and the album's release was probably due to the band's unsigned status, forcing them to find a distributor only after the album was finalized. It was ultimately released by Le Son Maquis, a French record label, on November 5, 2009.

The Mondrians performed two concerts on October 30 and 31 to support the album's release – one at the Bleu Lezard in Lausanne, the other in Martigny. They plan to tour Europe in support of the album.

Track listing

References

External links
The Mondrians official website

2009 debut albums
The Mondrians albums